Alexey Vyacheslavovich Timofeev (born 22 February 1991 in Slantsy, Soviet Union) is a Russian curler from Saint Petersburg.

He skippered the Russian national men's curling team at the 2016 and 2017 European Curling Championships.

On the World Curling Tour, Timofeev won his first event at the 2018 KW Fall Classic.

Awards 
 Russian Men's Curling Championship: Gold (2014, 2019), Silver (2015).
 Russian Men's Curling Cup: Gold (2013, 2014, 2016), Silver (2020).
 Russian Mixed Curling Championship: Gold (2014, 2020).
 Russian Mixed Doubles Curling Championship: Silver (2020).
 Master of Sports of Russia.

Personal life 
He is a student at the St. Petersburg Specialized School of Olympic Reserve, No. 2 (technical school).

Teammates
2016 European Curling Championships
 Alexey Stukalskiy, Third
 Timur Gadzhikhanov, Second
 Artur Ali, Lead
 Artur Razhabov, Alternate

References

External links 
 

Living people
1991 births
Russian male curlers
Curlers from Saint Petersburg
Russian curling champions
People from Slantsy
Competitors at the 2017 Winter Universiade